The 2019 Spengler Cup was held from 26 to 31 December 2019 at the Eisstadion Davos, in Davos, Switzerland.

Teams participating
  Team Canada
  HC Oceláři Třinec
  HC TPS
  Salavat Yulaev Ufa
  HC Ambrì-Piotta
  HC Davos (host)

Group stage

Group Torriani

Group Cattini

Knockout stage

Bracket

Quarterfinals

Semifinals

Final

All-Star Team

Source:

References

Spengler Cup
Spengler Cup
Spengler Cup
Spengler Cup
Spengler Cup
Spengler Cup
Spengler Cup